Ireland competed at the 2011 World Championships in Athletics from August 27 to September 4 in Daegu, South Korea.

Team selection

A team of 17 athletes was
announced to represent the country
in the event, although just before the event began Robert Heffernan pulled out following the death of his mother.  The team was led by race walker Olive Loughnane and
sprinter Paul Hession.

The following athletes appeared on the preliminary Entry List, but not on the Official Start List of the specific event, resulting in a total number of 16 competitors:

Results

Men

Women

References

External links
Official local organising committee website
Official IAAF competition website

World Championships in Athletics
Ireland at the World Championships in Athletics
Nations at the 2011 World Championships in Athletics